The Oriomo Plateau is a plateau in Western Province, Papua New Guinea.

The Oriomo languages are spoken in the region.

See also
Oriomo-Bituri Rural LLG
Oriomo Plateau languages
Oriomo River

References

Landforms of Papua New Guinea
Plateaus of Oceania
Western Province (Papua New Guinea)